Mandell Creighton (5 July 1843 – 14 January 1901) was a British historian and a bishop of the Church of England.  A scholar of the Renaissance papacy, Creighton was the first occupant of the Dixie Chair of Ecclesiastical History at the University of Cambridge, a professorship established around the time that history was emerging as an independent academic discipline.  He was also the first editor of the English Historical Review, the oldest English language academic journal in the field of history.  Creighton had a second career as a cleric in the Church of England.  He served as a parish priest in Embleton, Northumberland and later, successively, as a Canon Residentiary of Worcester Cathedral, the Bishop of Peterborough and the Bishop of London.  His moderation and worldliness drew praise from Queen Victoria and won notice from politicians.  It was widely thought at the time that Creighton would have become the Archbishop of Canterbury had his early death, at age 57, not supervened.

Creighton's historical work received mixed reviews.  He was praised for scrupulous even-handedness, but criticised for not taking a stand against historical excesses.  For his part, he was firm in asserting that public figures be judged for their public acts, not private ones.  His preference for the concrete to the abstract diffused through his writings on the Church of England.  He believed that the church was uniquely shaped by its particular English circumstances, and advocated that it reflect the views and wishes of the English people.

Creighton was married to the author and future women's suffrage activist Louise Creighton, and the couple had seven children.  The Creightons were passionately interested in the education of children and together wrote over a dozen school history primers.  A man of complex intelligence and exceptional vigour, Mandell Creighton was emblematic of the Victorian era both in his strengths and in his failings.

Early childhood, 1843–1857

Mandell Creighton was born on 5 July 1843 in the border country city of Carlisle, Cumberland (now in Cumbria) to Sarah (née Mandell) and Robert Creighton.  His mother was the tenth child of Thomas Mandell, a yeoman farmer from Bolton, Cumberland. His father, a carpenter, had built a successful cabinet-making and decorating business on Castle Street, the main thoroughfare in Carlisle.  A year later another son, James, was born to the couple and in 1846, a daughter, Mary, who died before the year was out.  In 1849, another daughter, Mary Ellen (Polly) was born and the following year, when Mandell was seven, Sarah Creighton died unexpectedly.  Robert, who never remarried, and never spoke of his wife again, raised the children with help from his unmarried sister who came to live with the family.

A self-made man, Robert Creighton,  constantly exhorted his sons to work, imbuing them with a sense of independence.  This later allowed Mandell to make career choices that were unorthodox for his background.  For his part, his brother James would join his father's carpentry business, enter local politics, be twice elected mayor of Carlisle, and later become a director of North British Railway.  Polly, by contrast, considered her childhood to be "horridly unhappy." Not being able to complete her school education, she never acquired the sophistication that she so greatly valued.  Even so, she would spend her adult life promoting the education of children, and in 1927 become the first woman to be granted freedom of the city of Carlisle.  The family living quarters, above the shop, were spacious but spartan—there was little decoration and few books.  As Robert was given to losing his temper easily, the household atmosphere could be dreary and fearful. There was a strong sense of duty in the household even if affection was not expressed openly. Years later, Mandell Creighton's wife was to speculate that the absence of a sense of belonging to a family in her husband's childhood was very likely the result of not having a mother.

Creighton's education began in a nearby dame school run by a stern headmistress. His restlessness and mischief led to his being punished frequently.  In 1852, he moved to the Carlisle Cathedral School. Under the influence of a charismatic headmaster, the Revd William Bell, he began to read voraciously and succeed academically.  Other students came seeking his help in translating passages from their classical studies; they gave him the nickname "Homer" on account of his quickness at construing.  In November 1857, he took the King's Scholarship examination for admission to Durham Grammar School located seventy miles away.  As his Carlisle teachers had not prepared him for translation of Latin verse, he left a portion of the exam unanswered and felt certain he had failed.  The examiners assessed his overall performance to be good and decided to accept him, offering him a scholarship.  In February 1858 the 15-year-old Creighton left Carlisle for Durham.

Durham School, 1858–1862

Durham School required its students to attend services in the eleventh-century Durham Cathedral on Sundays and holy days.  The cathedral's high church ceremony made a lasting impression on Creighton.  It became a focus of his religious life and would later influence his choice of career. Durham's headmaster, Dr Henry Holden, a classical scholar and an educational reformer, was soon taking interest in the new student.  With Holden's encouragement, Creighton began to win prizes in classical subjects, English, and in French.  During his last year at Durham, he was promoted to head boy of the school, a position that appealed to his great desire to influence people, especially younger boys.  Although he aimed to do this by setting an example with his high moral life, he did not, in an era of universal corporal punishment, hesitate to use the rod.  In a letter written to a Durham school monitor after Creighton had left the school, he advised, "Remember, never thrash a fellow a little, always hard: and it is always well that he be thrashed by more than one of the monitors"

Creighton was severely shortsighted; he also suffered from double vision, which forced him to read with one eye closed.  As the visual handicap also limited his participation in vigorous sports, he took to walking enthusiastically.  His tours of the countryside, often undertaken with companions, covered over twenty miles a day and lasted several days.  Walking gave him many opportunities to exercise his abiding curiosity about the local botany and architecture.  The habit was to remain with him for the rest of his life.

In the spring of 1862, Creighton applied unsuccessfully for a scholarship to Balliol College, Oxford.  He applied next to Merton College, Oxford for a classical postmastership.  His application proved successful and Creighton arrived in Oxford in October 1862.  He continued to take great interest in Durham School.  In a hand-me-down family story, he is said, in 1866, to have walked from Oxford to Durham in three days to hear speeches at a school function.

Oxford undergraduate, 1862–1866

Creighton's postmastership of £70 a year was enough to cover his tuition at Merton, but not much more.  For his other expenses he had to ask his father, whose gruff manner made asking difficult.  Under the circumstances, Creighton lived economically in college attic rooms for most of his time at Merton.  In his last year he moved out of college to share rooms with George Saintsbury (1845-1933), the future critic of English and French literature, author, and wine critic.

Although Creighton's shortsightedness prevented his participation in cricket and football, he was able to join the college rowing team.  He continued to go on walks.  These, especially around Oxford for a few hours in the late afternoon, were popular among many students; Creighton, characteristically, organised longer walks, some lasting all day.

Creighton's reading continued to flourish, and not just of books prescribed in the syllabus.  He read so voraciously that he sometimes stayed at Oxford during vacations in order to read.  Among writers and poets, he became particularly fond of Carlyle, Browning, Tennyson and Swinburne.  He was also becoming politically aware.  If pressed, he professed a liberalism based on the autonomy of the individual.  He joined the Oxford Union, and although he seldom gave public speeches there, he was elected Union president.  He especially honed his skills in informal conversations, conducted anywhere and everywhere, about topics great and small, bearing easily the yoke of what Gladstone later was to dub "Oxford's agony," the habit of seeing, self-importantly, larger than life significance in Oxford's everyday disputes.

Creighton came seriously to believe that it was the responsibility of all individuals to influence others to the full extent of their abilities.  He sought others out to influence and instruct.  Predictably, among his Merton friends, he received the nickname "The Professor", or "P".  In his second year, he and three other students became inseparable, both during academic terms and vacations, forming a group called "The Quadrilateral".  The group friendship was intense, like many such in that time. Although Creighton had a large circle of friends, he did not form any close friendships with women during this time.  In his final term, he wrote to a friend, "ladies in general are very unsatisfactory mental food: they seem to have no particular thoughts or ideas"

Academically, Creighton's goal became the pursuit of an honours degree in literae humaniores, a classical studies curriculum attracting the best students at Oxford.  In the final examinations, in the spring of his fourth year, he received a first-class.  Joining immediately the School of Law and Modern History, and studying all summer, he took the examinations in that School in Autumn 1866.  He received a second class this time, his examiners assessing that he had not mastered the details enough.  However, since the  literae humaniores degree was the more established one, he was asked by the classics professor, Benjamin Jowett, to apply for a college teaching fellowship.  As it turned out, he did not have to; he had decided that he would go on to accept holy orders, and his own college, Merton, offered him a clerical fellowship with tutorial duties on 22 December 1866.

Teaching and marriage, 1867–1874

During the second half of the 19th century, many academic reforms were instituted at the University of Oxford, beginning with the Oxford University Act of 1854 (17 & 18 Vict. c81).  By the 1860s the reforms had trickled down the colleges.  Among the changes were the new responsibilities given to college tutors.  These instructors, whose primary job was to give personalised instruction in their rooms to undergraduates, were now tasked with the preparation of students for the university's examinations, previously the responsibility of the university-wide instructors such as professors.  As the tutors were chosen from distinguished recent graduates, the new instructional staff were more youthful than the old.  At this time Merton College was suffering from student unrest stemming from what was seen as a lack of leadership in the teaching faculty.  Many fellows, both resident and non-resident, had become distant presences.

As Creighton was popular with students, he was looked upon as someone who would exercise that leadership.  He proceeded to do so by appealing both to the students' reasoning and their good sense, and by simultaneously immersing himself among them.  He was given more responsibilities.  These, in their wake, brought promotions and salary increases.  After four years of teaching, his salary had more than doubled.  He joined forces with a Merton tutor to open collegiate lectures to students of other colleges and received the college's authorisation.  Soon, the Association of Tutors was born, as well as an Oxford-wide series of lectures that any student could attend.  The lectures were to influence his choice of future research.  He wrote later, We worked out among us a scheme of lectures covering the whole field (of history), and were the pioneers of the "Intercollegiate Lectures" which now prevail at both universities.  The needs of this scheme threw upon me the ecclesiastical, and especially papal history, which no one else took.

Religious beliefs were also undergoing an upheaval.  Many Victorian intellectuals, who had been raised in Christian households, had, in their adult life, begun to experience religious doubt and were moving in secular directions.  Creighton, in contrast, was slowly solidifying his religious beliefs.  While his high church views had moderated somewhat, he never had any crisis of confidence.  He had no interest in the new natural sciences and was unmoved to read Darwin, regarding his writings as too much speculation.  Creighton's friend Henry Scott Holland wrote of him, "At the close of [the 1860s], it seemed to us at Oxford almost incredible that a young don of any intellectual reputation for modernity should be on the Christian side."  After some speculation by friends about whether Creighton would commit to taking holy orders, he was ordained deacon by the Bishop of Oxford in 1870.  He preached in his first sermon in April 1871.

Creighton spent many vacations in Europe.  He fell in love with Italy, its scenery, its culture, and its people.  This led naturally to a fascination with Renaissance Italy, which became his scholarly interest.  He became an admirer of Walter Pater and the aesthetic movement.  His rooms in Oxford were tastefully decorated with William Morris wallpaper and blue china.  The furnishings brought admiration from friends and requests to view them from acquaintances.  Creighton was now leading a life that was a far cry from that of his frugal student days.

Upon his return from a vacation in Europe, in early 1871, Creighton attended a lecture by art critic John Ruskin at the Sheldonian Theatre.  After the lecture, he noticed his friend, the future author Humphry Ward, talking to an unfamiliar young woman who was wearing a yellow scarf.  Yellow was Creighton's favourite colour; the scarf aroused his interest enough for him to ask Ward about the woman, whose name was Louise von Glehn. Von Glehn was the youngest daughter of a London merchant, Robert von Glehn, a naturalized British citizen who was originally from Reval in the Russian Governorate of Estonia. Soon Ward was inviting Creighton and von Glehn to a Valentine's Day lunch hosted in his rooms in Brasenose College.  In a few weeks, von Glehn found herself won over by Creighton's charm, and before she left Oxford at the end of the month, the two were engaged.  Their further courtship involved visiting the National Gallery and Victoria and Albert Museum, and examining the early Italian engravings in the print room of the British Museum. Creighton undertook to teach his fiance Italian; she helped him improve his German.  They had agreed to be married the following winter; however, as Christmas approached, it was still not certain whether Merton College would waive its requirement of celibacy for its teaching fellows.  On Christmas Eve, the college finally relented and elected four married fellows, one of whom was Creighton.  Von Glehn and Creighton were married on 8 January 1872 in her home town of Sydenham, Kent.  They spent a week honeymooning in Paris before returning to Oxford for Creighton's new teaching term.

Like many Victorian scholars, Mandell Creighton assumed that his wife would be an accessory in his academic pursuits and that he would have the upper hand in their intellectual relationship.  During their courtship, he had written to her: The nuisance of married life [is that] strive as I may or as you may, still the practical side of life must be much more prominent to me than to you.  I shall have a number of things to do; whereas your sphere will be all within my reach and knowledge, mine on the other hand will not be in your reach entirely.

In the summer of 1873, the couple took their first trip together to Italy.  It was during this trip that Creighton made firm his intention to study the Renaissance popes for his life's research.  During these years there were additions to the family: a daughter was born to the couple in the autumn of 1872, and another in the summer of 1874.  With a growing family and a clear research plan, Creighton now began to doubt the long-term viability of his Merton tutorial fellowship.  He felt more and more that his teaching duties were sapping his stamina for focused intellectual labour.  Around this time an opportunity arose for a rural living in a remote parish in coastal Northumberland to which Merton held the right of appointment.  Although varying counsel was offered by Louise, by Creighton's married colleagues, by his unmarried colleagues, and even by his students, his mind was made up.  When, in November 1874, the college finally offered the position of vicar of the parish of Embleton, Creighton eagerly accepted.

Vicar of Embleton, 1875–1884

The village of Embleton lies close to the North Sea shore in Northumberland approximately midway between Edinburgh and Newcastle upon Tyne.  The vicarage—then owned by Merton College and consisting of a fortified pele tower built in the 14th century along with adjoining later additions—was a large establishment with many rooms for Creighton's growing family, their guests, and servants.  The parish consisted of a handful of villages and approximately 1700 inhabitants, among whom were farmers, whinstone quarrymen, herring and haddock fishermen, women workers in fish curing yards, and railwaymen.  Although the Creightons missed Oxford society and its stimulations, they gradually adapted to their new surroundings.  With the help of a curate paid from his own funds, Creighton established a routine that enabled him to both carry out pastoral duty and write history.  Each weekday morning, he spent four hours reading in the vicarage library.  In the afternoons, Mandell, and whenever possible, Louise, visited the homes of their parishioners, listening to them, giving advice, offering prayers, conducting services for the housebound, and, on occasion, handing out home-made medical remedies.  They found their parishioners to be reserved, proud, and independent, but could not help seeing them as lacking in morals.  Their assessment of rampant alcoholism in Embleton led the Creightons, no teetotallers themselves, to found the local chapter of the Church of England Temperance Society and, in the process, to displease some locals.  Louise organised meetings of the Mothers' Union as well as The Girls' Friendly Society, which aimed to empower girls, encouraging them, for example, to stay in school until the age of fourteen.

Creighton's own family was growing: four more children were born during the Embleton years, and all were home schooled, mostly by Louise.  Creighton, who took great interest in the parish schools, served as examiner for other schools in the region, and began to formulate some ideas on the education of children.  He was elected to local government bodies such as the Board of Guardians, which enacted poor laws in the region, and to the local sanitary authority.  In 1879, he accepted his first leadership position in the Church of England: he was appointed rural dean of the Deanery of Alnwick, responsible for supervision of the clergy in neighbouring parishes.  Later, he was appointed examining chaplain for the Bishop of Newcastle, Ernest Roland Wilberforce, and tasked with examining candidates for holy orders.

During their ten years in Embleton, the Creightons—he in his 30s and she, for the most part, in her 20s—between them, wrote fifteen books.  They both wrote history books for young people, Louise wrote an unsuccessful novel, and Mandell wrote the first two volumes of his magnum opus, The History of the Papacy in the Period of Reformation.  In the Papacy volumes, Creighton proposed that the turbulence of the reformation became inevitable when the Popes obstructed the milder parliamentary reforms that had been advocated earlier.  The books were well received and were commended for their even-handed approach. Lord Acton, who reviewed the books in the Academy and who was aware that the books were written over a few years in a northern vicarage far from the centres of scholarship, wrote:  The history of increasing depravity and declining faith, of reforms earnestly demanded, feebly attempted, and deferred too long, is told by Mr. Creighton with a fullness of accuracy unusual in works which are the occupation of a lifetime. 

Creighton also wrote dozens of book-reviews and scholarly articles.  Among them were his first forays into the role of the Church of England in the life of the nation.  Throughout the 19th century, the Church had suffered erosion of membership.  In the mid-century, many scholars such as the educator Thomas Arnold had asserted the identity of the church and the nation; however, as the century entered its last two decades, Creighton was among a small minority continuing to do the same.

In 1884, Creighton was asked to apply for the newly created professorship of ecclesiastical history, the Dixie chair, at the University of Cambridge and a concurrent fellowship at Emmanuel College.  His application proved successful, and on 9 November 1884, Creighton preached his last sermon at Embleton church.  Later, he was to write, "At Embleton I spent ten years, and I have no hesitation in saying that they were the ten happiest years of my life."  His parishioners, for their part, found it difficult to express their feelings openly; one woman said, "Well, if you ain't done no good, you've done no harm."

Cambridge professor, 1885–1891

After their arrival in Cambridge in late November 1884, the Creightons were swamped with invitations to social engagements.  Interaction with academic society after ten years led to new friendships, especially for Louise.  One such new acquaintance, Beatrice Webb, was to become Louise's firm lifelong friend.  Although Creighton had already corresponded with fellow historian Lord Acton, he soon met him in person, as he did other Cambridge notables, such as Robertson Smith, the Hebrew and Arabic scholar, and Alfred Marshall, the economist.

Around this time a dispute arose over the scope of the bachelor's honours examination, or the tripos, in History and Theology.  The History tripos had been created by historian John Seeley who held that history was really political history, an essential part of the training of public servants, and stated tersely, "history is the school of statesmanship."  Opposing him, reformers such as historian George Walter Prothero, and Henry Melvill Gwatkin, Creighton's successor to the Dixie chair, advocated a broader and more scientific approach.  In spring 1885, the board of historical studies in Cambridge met to consider reforms.  Although Creighton did not take a direct part in the discussions, he sided with the reformers, and a compromise was reached that emphasized the reading of primary sources in the students' historical subjects of interest.

Creighton lectured twice a week at the university, preparing extensively, but lecturing extemporaneously.  He also preached in the Emmanuel College Chapel.  A colleague said of his preaching style, "He did not care for eloquence, indeed he despised it; what he aimed at was instruction, and for this he always looked more to principles than facts."  Creighton lectured more informally to undergraduates at Emmanuel College once a week.  He supported Cambridge's two new women's colleges, Newnham and Girton, and taught informal weekly classes at Newnham.  Two students from those classes, Mary Bateson and Alice Gardner, later became professional historians; both were mentored by Creighton early in their careers.

In spring 1885, Creighton accepted an offer from the Prime Minister, William Gladstone, of a residentiary canonry at Worcester Cathedral.  As the residency requirement of three months could be met during Cambridge vacations, the Creighton family settled into an annual routine of six moves between Cambridge and Worcester, a distance of over 100 miles.  The Worcester experience led Creighton to consider how the relationship of competition between a cathedral and its diocesan parish churches could be turned into one of cooperation, a subject on which he would write scholarly articles.  By providing an introduction to the grim realities of city life, Worcester, moreover, awakened Creighton's social consciousness.  He joined the Worcester Diocesan Penitentiary Association and was moved by the plight of prison inmates.  In a sermon at the Sanitary Congress of Worcester in 1889, he spoke about the effect of harsh physical life on the moral life, the unwholesome air of the factory, the crowded workshop, the ill-ventilated room, all those things rob the body of its vigour, how they must also act upon the soul!  ... uncleanliness, hatred, variance, drunkenness, revelling.  Do not these things, think you, come largely from, and are they not greatly affected by, the physical conditions under which life is lived? 

At the 250th anniversary of Harvard University in November 1886, Creighton, accompanied by Louise, represented Emmanuel College—founder John Harvard's alma mater.  During the extended visit, they met prominent American men of letters, including the historian of the American West, Francis Parkman; supreme court justice, Oliver Wendell Holmes, Jr.; and poet and critic James Russell Lowell.  On 8 November 1886, Creighton received an honorary degree from Harvard.

In February 1887, volumes III and IV of Creighton's History of the Papacy were published by Longmans.  These volumes narrowed the focus to specific popes, chiefly, Sixtus IV, Alexander VI, and Julius II.  In his characteristic approach of maintaining historiographical balance and considering individuals to be very much mired in their historical eras, Creighton did not single out anyone for special condemnation, even Alexander VI, whose great disrepute Creighton felt was "largely due to the fact that he did not add hypocrisy to his other vices."  Earlier, in 1885, Creighton had agreed to become the first editor of a new journal, the English Historical Review.  Now, he requested Acton to review his two volumes for the journal.  The review Acton wrote was not only hostile but, in Creighton's view, also obscure.  In the following weeks, there were contentious exchanges between the two men, polarising eventually into their two views of history, Acton's normative approach versus Creighton's more relativist one.  It was in one of these exchanges that Acton penned three sentences, one of which was to become an oft-quoted epigram. "Historical responsibility," wrote Acton, "has to make up for the want of legal responsibility.  Power tends to corrupt, and absolute power corrupts absolutely.  Great men are almost always bad men, even when they exercise influence and not authority."  Acton's attack, however, did lead Creighton to rethink his own position somewhat.  In an 1895 paper, he would write that the papacy, "which had been established for the promotion of morality" had in fact "provided the means for the utmost immorality."

Bishop of Peterborough, 1891–1896

In December 1890, Creighton received a letter from Lord Salisbury, the Prime Minister, offering an appointment to a residentiary canonry of St George's Chapel, Windsor Castle in exchange for his appointment at Worcester.  Since a Windsor appointment indicated the personal preference of the British sovereign, and since the Creightons were wary of court culture, the letter gave them pause.  However, after some hesitation, Creighton accepted.  No sooner had he and his family reconciled to moving back and forth between their Cambridge home and Windsor Castle six times a year than Creighton received another letter from Salisbury.  The new letter offered an appointment as Bishop of Peterborough, an office that had become available upon the translation of its incumbent William Connor Magee to York.  Creighton was chosen because his love for ritual had created an impression among others that he had a high church outlook.  The Peterborough diocese had many high churchmen, and it was felt that Creighton would be a good fit.  In fact, Creighton was doctrinally quite broad church; his moderate views would later make him popular with Queen Victoria.

For Creighton, the Peterborough appointment, which he felt duty-bound to accept, meant the effective end of his academic life.  There is an indication that the Creightons were depressed at the prospect of leaving Cambridge. In the case of Louise, the depression was to last long.  Creighton felt that his life from then on would become one of offering easy comfort to others.  In a letter to an old college friend, he wrote, "No man could have less desire than I for the office of bishop.  Nothing save the cowardliness of shirking from responsibility and the dread of selfishness led me to submit"

A few weeks before Creighton's consecration as bishop at Westminster Abbey in late April 1891, he fell ill with muscular rheumatism.  Soon after his enthronement at Peterborough Cathedral in mid-May 1891, he fell ill again, this time with influenza.  Each time, the recovery was prolonged.  The Peterborough diocese, then comprising 676 parishes and including Leicester and Northampton, offered a vast ecclesiastical challenge.  Creighton met it in the manner he had employed in Embleton: he proceeded to visit every corner.  Travelling by train to distant parishes, staying overnight with the parish priests, and conducting services in their churches, Creighton spent very little time at home with his family during the first year.  However, his immersion among the clergy, treatment of them as equals, and dispatch in attending to their concerns, gradually increased his popularity.  The experience also helped him to work out his doctrinal stance.  Although he was personally liberal, he came firmly to believe that to be English was to be Anglican, and led him to regard dissenters as having lost their way, and Roman Catholics as disloyal.

Creighton also became determined to better understand the working-classes of his diocese.  The Leicester boot-and-shoe trade strike of 1895, which began in March as a lock-out of 120,000 workers by employers, gave him just such an opportunity.  Creighton wrote an open letter to his clergy, impressed them with the gravity of the situation, and urged them to work impartially to facilitate communication between the opposing sides.  According to biographer James Covert, "Creighton's tactic was to serve as conduit for all bargaining parties, sharing information and feelings derived from his local clergy, who, being on the spot, possessed insights and sympathies that needed to be known and expressed."  By late April, a compromise was reached for which Creighton reaped much praise as well as a growing reputation as a statesman.

A year earlier, in 1894, the fifth and last volume of Creighton's History of Papacy in the Period of Reformation was published by Longman.  The book was subtitled The German Revolt, 1517–1527 and covered the history up to the Sack of Rome in 1527.  Creighton had found little time to devote to its writing, and critics generally expressed disappointment in the outcome.  Although he had originally planned to continue the history up to the final session of the Council of Trent in 1563, Creighton did not now feel up to the task.  As the volumes did not cover the period claimed in their title, the publisher, in 1897, brought out a second edition titled, A History of the Papacy from the Great Schism to the Sack of Rome, 1378–1527 reflecting the reduced scope.  Creighton, nonetheless, remained a popular lecturer.  During his Peterborough years, he gave many lectures, most published later in book form, their titles reflecting his diverse intellectual interests.  Among his addresses were the Hulsean Lectures at Cambridge in the winter of 1893–94 on "Persecution and Tolerance", the 1895 Rede Lecture at Cambridge on "The Early Renaissance in England", the 1896 Romanes Lecture at Oxford on "The English National Character", and his 1896 address at Westminster Abbey on "Saint Edward the Confessor."

In 1896, Creighton represented the Church of England at the coronation of Czar Nicholas II in Moscow.  He was chosen after the Archbishop of Canterbury, Edward White Benson, begged off going to the event citing ill-health, and after the same excuse was offered for Randall Davidson, the Bishop of Winchester, who as Prelate of the Order of the Garter was the official stand-in.  Creighton's selection as ostensible third in line led to much speculation and controversy in church circles.  A lover of pageantry, Creighton wore a bishop's coronation cope, borrowed from Westminster Abbey, and carried his own mitre and pastoral staff for the event.  On his return, he wrote a glowing account of the coronation in Cornhill Magazine, which, after gaining the attention of Queen Victoria, elicited a letter from her requesting several copies for the royal family.

Bishop of London, 1897–1901
On 28 October 1896, a few days after the death of the Archbishop Benson, Creighton received a letter from the British prime minister Lord Salisbury offering appointment as Bishop of London.  There were rumours at the time that the offer had come with the promise of an eventual archbishopric of Canterbury.  In January 1897, Creighton was translated to the See of London in an enthronement ceremony at St Paul's Cathedral.

Among other prelates, Creighton was sometimes regarded with suspicion, even considered too scholarly or frivolous.  However, his star had risen rapidly in government and court circles, in part due to his worldliness.  Although ecclesiastical high office had been thrust upon him and disrupted his academic career, Creighton now felt comfortable about the prospects of rising to its pinnacle, holding out hope for a return to scholarly endeavours at the end.

One of Creighton's first efforts after becoming Bishop of London was to support the passage of the Voluntary School Bill of 1897.  Almost thirty years earlier, the Elementary Education Act of 1870 had established non-denominational elementary schools, also called board schools, which were funded by local taxes. Religious schools, also called "voluntary schools" had, however, not received this support.  The bill asked for extension of taxpayer support to the voluntary schools.  In March 1897, Creighton addressed the House of Lords in support of the bill, which was eventually passed by both Houses of Parliament.  Creighton felt strongly that all religious instruction be denominational.  In a letter to the London district school boards, he wrote, "We only ask that the wishes of the parents be consulted about [religious] education of their children, and that every child in England should receive instruction in the religious beliefs of the denomination to which his parents belong."  Creighton also succeeded Frederic Leighton as President of the Committee commissioning the Survey of London which documented the capital's principal buildings and public art.

By 1898, Creighton was increasingly occupied with a debate over ritual practice in the Diocese of London, and, more generally, in the Church of England.  On his arrival in London, he had discovered that low church clergy in his diocese were taking exception to the ritual practices of some high churchmen, practices which indicated Roman Catholic influence.  The controversy had begun in the wake of the Oxford Movement, which had created a Catholic revival within the Anglican church, prominent among which were the Anglo-Catholics.  One of the radical low churchmen, the evangelical cleric John Kensit, had protested that Creighton himself had on occasion worn a cope and carried a mitre.  Kensit requested that Creighton take a more definite public stance against high church rituals, such as the use of candles and incense.  Creighton, who preferred to work behind the scenes, did engage many high church clergy.  Although he seemed to subscribe to a broad branch theory, that the real Catholic Church was a collection of national churches which included the Church of England, the Church of Rome, and the Eastern Orthodox Church, he was firm about asserting Anglican doctrine—that liturgical practice, beyond that involving what he termed "permissible liberty," conform to that in the Book of Common Prayer.  In a circular letter to his clergy, he wrote:It is absolutely necessary that nothing should be done which affects the due performance of the Church as laid down in the Book of Common Prayer, and that any additional services which are used should conform entirely to the spirit and intention of the Prayer Book. However, this still did not seem to satisfy Kensit and his more vocal evangelical supporters, who threatened to create more public disruption.  Eventually, the Church of England's two archbishops, of Canterbury and York, held a hearing in Lambeth Palace, and, in August 1899, ruled against the use of candles and incense, a seeming victory for the low church forces.  The wider doctrinal conflict, though, was to continue beyond both the Victorian and Edwardian eras.

Throughout this time, Creighton conducted the endless business that came with his large diocese.  In one year, he was recorded to have given 294 formal sermons and addresses.  He made trips to Windsor Castle and Sandringham to conduct services for Queen Victoria.  In 1897, he organised a special service of thanksgiving outside St Paul's in commemoration of her Diamond Jubilee.  His prominent office, moreover, brought other responsibilities.  He was appointed to the Privy Council; he became a trustee of the British Museum, the National Portrait Gallery, and a host of other organisations.

Creighton's health was now worrying his family and friends.  Starting in 1898, he had begun to experience bouts of stomach pain.  By 1899, these had increased in severity, and by the summer of 1900, his doctors were suspecting a stomach tumour.  Creighton was operated on twice in December of that year, however, the surgeries were not successful.  In early January he experienced two severe stomach haemorrhages and his condition rapidly declined.  Mandell Creighton died on Monday, 14 January 1901, aged 57. A nearby road, Creighton Avenue, laid out in 1900, was named after him /

Legacy

On Thursday, 17 January 1901, after an elaborate funeral in St Paul's Cathedral attended by royalty, politicians, academics, and ordinary people, Creighton's body was interred in the crypt by the Archbishop of Canterbury. It was the first time in 280 years that a Bishop of London had been buried in St Paul's.  Obituaries in contemporary newspapers and scholarly journals hailed him as one of England's great historians and a prelate of remarkable integrity.  The Quarterly Review remarked, "It is certainly rare to find so much intellectual force and so high a standard of conduct combined in one man."

A memorial to Creighton can also be found in Peterborough Cathedral just north of the sanctuary in the form of a substantial mosaic depicting his effigy, details of his life and the mottos "I determined not to know anything among you save Jesus Christ" and "He tried to write true history."

Today, Creighton is better known as a historian than as a church official.  Creighton's work is seen as part of an era in British historiography.  Many of the milestones of Creighton's academic life, such as founding of the English Historical Review in 1886, with himself as the first editor, are those of the era as well.  According to historian Philippa Levine:The Review was the culmination of a series of related developments central to the asserting of the primacy of the professional historian.  In 1884 a highly distinguished trio of men had all been rewarded with academic preferment: Mandell Creighton became the first Dixie Professor of Ecclesiastical History at the University of Cambridge, E. A. Freeman succeeded his friend Stubbs in the Regius Professorship of Modern History at Oxford and the legal historian Frederick Maitland became reader in English Law at Cambridge.  The following year the reform of the Historical Tripos in Cambridge and the division of Oxford's arts faculty into the three areas of literae humaniores, oriental languages and modern history declared that history had finally won academic respect as an autonomous area of study.

Creighton is considered to be one of the first British historians with a distinctly European outlook.  Of his magnum opus, History of the Papacy in the Period of the Reformation, R. J. W. Evans writes, "(It) constitutes one of the first great attempts to introduce the British to explicitly modern  and European history."  Overall, Creighton and his peers, left a heterogeneous legacy.  On the one hand, Creighton was a painstakingly balanced scholar; even his critic Lord Acton would use "sovereign impartiality" to describe Creighton's strength.  Creighton saw himself as someone interested in actions, in contrast to Acton, whom he considered to be interested in ideas.  Although Creighton did not personally consider the popes to be guiltless (for example, amidst writing the third papacy volume, he wrote, in a letter to a friend, that working on the Borgias was like "spending one's day in a low police court"), Creighton was emphatic that public men be judged for their public and not private actions.  In an essay, "Historical ethics", published after his death, he wrote, "I like to stand upon clear grounds which can be proved and estimated.  I do not like to wrap myself in the garb of outraged dignity because men in the past did things contrary to the principles which I think soundest in the present."  On the other hand, Creighton's historical outlook, as well as that of his historian peers, bore the cultural and social stamp of their position.  According to historians Robert Harrison, Aled Jones, and Peter Lambert, "Their emphasis on the Englishness of Britain's key institutions, for instance, effectively excluded non-English ethnic groups from the 'chief part,' as Creighton had put it, of history's subject."

The emphasis on concreteness and reality would remain a feature of his career as a prelate.  Creighton saw the Church of England not as an abstract entity existing independently in space and time, but as rooted in England, its people, and their history.  In the words of Kenneth Robbins, "It was an unashamed acknowledgment on (Creighton's) part that the form, structure, ethos and doctrine of that church had been fashioned in the circumstances of English history."  Similarly, Creighton saw the living church as an embodiment of the present-day yearnings of the English people.  "(The) general trend of the Church", he wrote, "must be regulated by (the English people's) wishes.  The Church cannot go too far from them."  Consequently, Creighton could imbue the church with Victorian self-assessments and aspirations.  "The function of the Church of England", he was comfortable saying, "was to be a church of free men.  The Church of Rome was the church of decadent peoples: it lives only in the past, and has no future ... The Church of England has before it the conquest of the world."  As a natural corollary of this outlook, Creighton was explicitly against the separation of church and state.  In his way of thinking, church and state were two aspects of the nation as seen from two vantage points.  Any attempt at legislating a separation would, in addition, have caused social disruptions in late-Victorian Britain: many higher clergy had ties of education and friendship with prominent public men.

During his lifetime Creighton received honorary doctorates from many institutions, among them Oxford, Cambridge, Harvard, and Trinity College, Dublin.  A few years after his death, the Creighton lecture was established at King's College, London.  The lecture series celebrated its centenary in 2007.

Creighton was elected a member of the American Antiquarian Society in 1897.

Character

Creighton was a man of complex, sometimes baffling, intelligence. The philosopher Edward Caird, a fellow at Merton during Creighton's student days there, said of him, "Creighton possesses common sense in a degree which amounts to genius." Later, at Cambridge, some colleagues were perplexed by his personality.  When teaching or transacting academic business, he displayed a shrewd, canny intelligence. However, at social gatherings, much to the delight of the students present, he was continually outrageous and flippant. His relationship with Louise was not easily characterised. In the months after the Peterborough appointment, husband and wife would frequently quarrel, sometimes bitterly, as a niece would later recall. But the couple could also be surprisingly demonstrative for their times: during this same period, a nephew caught sight of Louise locked in passionate embrace with the bishop in the latter's study. Creighton could be stern with his seven children, on one occasion tying a daughter to a table's leg with a rope to aid her in recognising her folly. However, he could also romp around the house with them, engage in horseplay, and make up nonsensical stories—all of which, many years later, they would consider the highlights of their childhood. He was the father of seven: Beatrice in 1872, Lucia in 1874, Cuthbert in 1876, Walter in 1878, Mary in 1880, Oswin in 1883 and, finally, Gemma, born in 1887.

Throughout his life, Creighton went on long walks (his "rambles," as he liked to call them). When the children grew older, the family's outdoor pastime of choice became field hockey. Many visiting clergy at Fulham Palace found themselves unable to refuse Creighton's enthusiastic invitations to join in. The Creightons were inveterate travellers, spending many vacations in Italy. During their six years in Peterborough, for instance, they made nine foreign trips. Creighton was also a lifelong chain smoker. When author Samuel Butler, no sympathiser of churchmen, received a letter in 1893 inviting him to visit the Creighton family in Peterborough, he was immediately put at ease when he discovered some tobacco thoughtlessly left in the envelope by the Bishop of Peterborough.

Controversy seemed to trail him during his prelacies. He loved pageantry, creating speculation that he had high church views.   However, when a high church priest protested that incense was needed for curing souls, Creighton burst out, "And you think that souls like herring cannot be cured without smoke?" His moderate views—equally opposed to radical evangelicals and conservative Anglo-Catholics—endeared him to Queen Victoria. Creighton's work ethic, though, was anything but moderate. He seldom refused offers of additional responsibility, confessing more than once to both an abiding fatalism about being saddled with more responsibility and guilt about shirking from it. Perhaps recognising this, a canon of St Paul's, while welcoming Creighton to the diocese of London in 1897, ominously remarked, "It is a frightful burden to lay on you: I hope you will use up everybody except yourself."

Works

References

Notes

Cited sources

Further reading
 
 
 
 
 
 
 
 
 
 
 Paul, Herbert (1906), 'Bishop Creighton', Stray Leaves, London : John Lane, The Bodley Head, pp. 11 – 37

External links

 Robert Evans (Oxford), Lecture: The Creighton Century, British Historians and Europe (1907–2007), King's College London.  Video Link: November 2007.
 
 
 
 

1843 births
1901 deaths
People from Carlisle, Cumbria
Alumni of Merton College, Oxford
Fellows of Merton College, Oxford
19th-century English historians
Bishops of Peterborough
Bishops of London
Deans of the Chapel Royal
Burials at St Paul's Cathedral
19th-century Church of England bishops
Dixie Professors of Ecclesiastical History
Members of the Privy Council of the United Kingdom
Members of the American Antiquarian Society
People educated at Carlisle Grammar School
People educated at Durham School
Presidents of the Oxford Union
People from Embleton, Northumberland